The Brazilian galliwasp (Diploglossus lessonae) is a carnivorous species of lizard endemic to northeastern Brazil.  It is known in Brazil as the “Calango Coral” or “Calango Liso”

Etymology
D. lessonae is named in honour of Italian zoologist Michele Lessona.

Description
Offspring are zebra-patterned, with white and black stripes circling their bodies. Adults are brown, with red/yellow-coloured heads and undersides, and have small legs.

Habitat
D. lessonae is commonly found in semiarid environments, scrub, and low forests.

References

Further reading
Peracca MG. 1890. Descrizione di una nuova specie del gen. DIPLOGLOSSUS - Wiegm. ". Bollettino dei Musei di Zoologia ed Anatomia comparata della R. Università di Torino 5: (77): 1-5 (unnumbered). (Diploglossus lessonae, new species). (in Italian).

External links
 zoologico.sp.gov.br (in Portuguese. Translation)

Diploglossus
Lizards of South America
Reptiles of Brazil
Endemic fauna of Brazil
Reptiles described in 1890
Taxa named by Mario Giacinto Peracca